Peethambara is a genus of fungi in the Hypocreales order; previously classed incertae sedis (relationships unknown), this genus is now placed in the family Stachybotryaceae.

This is a monotypic genus, containing the single species Peethambara sundara.

References

External links
Peethambara at Index Fungorum

Hypocreales genera
Monotypic Sordariomycetes genera
Stachybotryaceae